Hollis is an unincorporated community in Perry County, Arkansas, United States.

The Hollis Country Store and the South Fourche LaFave River Bridge, which are listed on the National Register of Historic Places, are in the community.

References

Unincorporated communities in Perry County, Arkansas
Unincorporated communities in Arkansas